The University of Michigan–Flint (UM-Flint, UMF) is a public university in Flint, Michigan. It is one of the two regional universities operating under the policies of the University of Michigan Board of Regents, the other being the University of Michigan-Dearborn.

UMF is one of the five doctoral/professional universities in the State of Michigan The university's enrollment is approximately 6,400 students. There are 138 majors/concentrations that apply to 12 Bachelor's degrees and 43 graduate majors/concentrations. UMF also offers graduate degrees, including 15 master's degree programs and 12 doctoral degree/specialist programs.

The university's colleges and schools include the College of Arts and Sciences (CAS), College of Health Sciences (CHS), School of Education & Human Services (SEHS), School of Management (SOM), School of Nursing (SON) and College of Innovation and Technology (CIT).

The university's student-athletes compete in intramural and club sports as the UMF Wolverines, while an unofficial student vote in 2009 selected The Victors to avoid confusion with the Michigan Wolverines. In 2013, the Flint men's ice hockey team earned a spot in the ACHA Division III National Tournament for the first time, eventually advancing to the National Championship Game against the Adrian Bulldogs. The university does not offer varsity intercollegiate athletics.

History

Flint Senior College (1956-1964)

Former Flint mayor C.S. Mott first suggested bringing a full university to Flint in a meeting with then-President Alexander Ruthven in 1946. Mott pledged to give $1 million to the project if the voters would pass a $7 million bond issue. The University of Michigan initially opposed Mott's idea but, ultimately, agreed to create the Flint Senior College of the University of Michigan as an extension of the existing Flint Junior College (now Mott Community College), while the colleges remained separate institutions.

While founded in 1956, three years before the founding of the Dearborn Center (now University of Michigan–Dearborn), the Flint Senior College was not the first branch of the University of Michigan ever established. The University of Michigan, founded in 1817, was historically a central authority, being granted the power to establish schools, colleges, and branches throughout the Territory of Michigan. The University of Michigan expected these branches to convert into independent colleges and universities once they matured as free-standing entities and could operate on their own. Kalamazoo College was one of the most prominent examples. This college operated as the Kalamazoo Branch of the University of Michigan from 1840 to 1850.

For a number of years, the college shared the Court Street campus with Flint Junior College. This campus was part of the Flint Cultural Center with major donations from many Flint business leaders. Original donors included the Sponsors Fund of Flint and William Ballenger. The first building constructed in 1954 was The Ballenger Field House.

In February 1956, David M. French was named the first dean of the Flint Senior College. The college began classes in 1956 with 118 full-time and 49 part-time students. Degrees were offered in liberal arts and sciences and in the professional fields of education and business administration. The college's first class graduated in 1958.

Flint College (1964-1971)

The college became a four-year institution in 1964, adding its first freshman class the next year. In 1970, the North Central Association of Colleges and Secondary Schools granted accreditation to the Flint College of the University of Michigan.

University of Michigan–Flint (1971-)

The Regents approved the name change to The University of Michigan–Flint in 1971, to emphasize that it was a free-standing unit of the university. The Regents later named William E. Moran as the first chancellor of the university. Two schools were formed at Flint in 1975, the College of Arts and Sciences, the School of Management.

The community and city assisted UM–Flint in acquiring 42 acres along the Flint River. $5 million over five years was pledged towards a new campus in 1972 by the C.S. Mott Foundation. During September 1972, sixteen temporary buildings were erected to ease campus overcrowding, pressuring the Regents to move UM-Flint to its current location along the Flint River.

On September 1, 1973, the Regents passed the plans for the first building by Sedgewick-Sellers & Associates, originally planned for a site at Lapeer Road and Court Street. Instead, the first building was moved to a site on the Flint River, the current campus location. The university acquired the Ross House and the Hubbard Building. Its ground breaking ceremony was held on May 9, 1974, at the Wilson Park bandstand.  In 1977, construction ended on the Class Room Office Building (CROB), later named David M. French Hall, and the Central Energy Plant. CROB included a library and theatre. In 1979, the original Harrison Street Halo Burger location was vacated to make way for UMF parking. While, the Harding Mott University Center (UCen) was finished that same year and the Recreation Center in 1982.

William S. Murchie Science Building was completed in 1988. In 1991, UM-Flint took over ownership of the Water Street Pavilion as the University Pavilion keeping restaurants there while moving in administrative offices. The library moved to its own building in 1994 with the completion of the Frances Willson Thompson Library. The 25-acre site across the river on the north side was acquired in 1997. Northbank Center was acquired in 1998.

In 1989, the School of Health Professions and Studies was formed and later renamed the College of Health Sciences in 2018. The School of Education and Human Services was formed in 1997.

In September 1999, Juan E. Mestas began his tenure as the fifth chancellor of UMF. The William S. White Building was completed on the north side of the Flint River in 2002 for School of Health Professions and Studies and the School of Management. Halo Burger returned to the campus in September 2002 only to be forced out due to on-campus housing food regulations in 2008.

Ruth Person became chancellor in 2008. The first on-campus dorms, First Street Residence Hall, were completed in 2008. UMF in 2010 was the fastest-growing public university in the state of Michigan.  The School of Management moved to a leased floor of the Riverfront Residence Hall in early 2013 from the White Building at renovation cost of $5.3 million. In 2013, Person's five-year term was up and was extended for a year by U of M President Mary Sue Coleman to 2014.

In August 2014, Sue Borrego began as chancellor. On October 15, 2015, University Board of Regents approved the purchase of the 160,000-square-foot, 10-story north tower building of the Citizens Banking Buildings from FirstMerit Bank for $6 million expected to close in March 2016. In mid-December 2015, the Uptown Reinvestment Corporation donated the Riverfront Residence Hall and Banquet Center to the university with the Charles Stewart Mott Foundation forgiving the remaining redevelopment loan for the center. On October 20, 2016, the Regents formed the School of Nursing from the Department of Nursing in the School of Health Professions and Studies. The Harrison Street Annex, at Kearsley and Harrison Streets in the Harrison Street parking structure, has been remodeled to be the university's engineering design studio.

Academics

Admissions

The 2022 annual ranking of U.S. News & World Report categorizes UMF as "more selective". For the Class of 2025 (enrolled fall 2021), UMF received 4,021 applications and accepted 2,970 (73.9%). Of those accepted, 495 enrolled, a yield rate (the percentage of accepted students who choose to attend the university) of 16.7%. UMF's freshman retention rate is 70.19%, with 35% going on to graduate within six years.

The enrolled first-year class of 2025 had the following standardized test scores: the middle 50% range (25th percentile-75th percentile) of SAT scores was 1020-1250, while the middle 50% range of ACT scores was 21-29.

Rankings and accreditation

The Princeton Review included UMF in the "Best Midwestern" category in their publication 2020 Best Colleges: Region by Region. They also included UMF's School of Management as one of the Best Business Schools in their 2017 publication. The Part-Time MBA Program was ranked 41st in the United States (overall) and ninth in the Midwest (by region) in 2010 by Businessweek.

UMF is accredited by the Higher Learning Commission (HLC) of Colleges and Schools. Program-level accreditation is maintained by many programs in affiliation with: the Accreditation Board for Engineering and Technology, the American Chemical Society, Association for the Accreditation of Human Research Protection Programs, the Association to Advance Collegiate School of Business – International, Association of University Programs in Health Administration, the Commission on Accreditation in Physical Therapy Education, Commission on Accreditation in Respiratory Care, the Commission of Collegiate Nursing Education, the Council for Accreditation of Teacher Education, the Council on Accreditation for Nurse Anesthesia Educational Programs, the Council on Social Work Education, the Joint Review Committee on Education in Radiologic Technology, Michigan Department of Education, the National Association for the Education of Young Children and the National Association of Schools of Music.

Academic divisions

There are 138 majors/concentrations that apply to 12 Bachelor's degrees and 43 graduate majors/concentrations. UMF also offers graduate degrees including master's degrees, Professional Doctorals, and Ph.D. degrees. The university's colleges and schools include the College of Arts and Sciences (CAS), College of Health Sciences (CHS), School of Education & Human Services (SEHS), School of Management (SOM), School of Nursing (SON) and College of Innovation and Technology (CIT). Its most popular undergraduate majors, in terms of 2021 graduates, were:
Registered Nursing/Registered Nurse (319)
Psychology (98)
Health/Health Care Administration/Management (52)
Accounting (41)
Biology/Biological Sciences (36)
Business Administration & Management (33)
Computer Science (32)
Mechanical Engineering (31)

Residential and student life

On campus housing

In November 2004, the Board of Regents of the University of Michigan approved the request of the Flint Campus to explore the feasibility of student housing. After several assessments, studies, and surveys showing the probable progression of growth of the campus, student housing was approved. On July 16, 2007, the first-ever student dormitory, the First Street Residence Hall, opened for students.

In December 2015, Uptown Reinvestment Corporation donated the Riverfront Residence Hall, a privately owned high-rise building that houses both UM-Flint and Baker College students, to the university. The 16-story Residence Hall can house up to 500 students.

Student organizations
There are over 100 recognized student organizations and 8 Sponsored Student Organizations (SSOs). They are organizations for various academic departments, religions, and cultural backgrounds, as well as organizations for honors, club sports, social fraternities and sororities, service groups, and special interests.

University sponsored organizations:
The Michigan Times, the student newspaper of the University of Michigan–Flint.
Black Student Union
Campus Activities Board
College Panhellenic Association
Interfraternity Council
National Pan-Hellenic Council
Qua Literary and Fine Arts Magazine
Student Government

Greek life
The university is home to several fraternities and sororities:

Sororities:
Delta Sigma Theta
Sigma Gamma Rho
Zeta Phi Beta
Phi Sigma Sigma
Sigma Sigma Sigma
Theta Phi Alpha

Fraternities:
Alpha Phi Alpha
Kappa Alpha Psi
Phi Beta Sigma
Alpha Sigma Phi
Kappa Sigma
Theta Chi

Radio station
The school owns WFUM (91.1 FM), a public radio station affiliated with the Michigan Radio network.

Student newspaper
The Michigan Times is a student-run campus newspaper.  In 2008, the Michigan Press Association's "Better College Newspaper Contest" awarded The Michigan Times with nine awards in a statewide competition. This achievement was surpassed in 2009 by winning 23 awards. The newspaper is printed weekly and is available free-of-cost on campus, at other area colleges, in the surrounding downtown area and elsewhere in the Greater Flint area.

Student government
The University of Michigan–Flint Student Government represents the students and manages student funds on the campus. Student Government is a member of the statewide Association of Michigan Universities.

Athletics
Michigan–Flint does not offer varsity intercollegiate athletics, but there are a number of club sport teams and intramural sports leagues available to students. Teams have competed as Wolverines, while an unofficial student vote in 2009 selected The Victors to avoid confusion with the Michigan Wolverines. Students, staff and alumni are also able to buy tickets to the flagship campus' sporting events at a discounted price.

Current Club Sports include:

Men's & Women's Basketball
Cheer
Men's Ice Hockey
Men's & Women's Soccer
Women's Volleyball
Softball

In 2013, the men's ice hockey team earned a spot in the ACHA Division III National Tournament for the first time, eventually advancing to the National Championship Game against fellow Michigan Collegiate Hockey Conference foe Adrian Bulldogs. In 2015, the women's hockey team went 18–0 in conference play.

Football was previously offered as a club sport, before financial shortfalls led to the discontinuation of the NCFA club in 2015.

Notable faculty and alumni 
 Jim Ananich – Michigan Senate minority leader
 Shari Ballard – former Best Buy senior executive VP 
 Deborah Cherry – former Michigan state senator
 John D. Cherry – 62nd lieutenant governor of Michigan
 Bobby Crim – former Michigan Speaker of the House and state representative and founder of the Crim Festival of Races 
 Christopher Paul Curtis (2000) – writer and Newbery Medal winner
 Erin Darke – actress
 Mona Haydar – rapper, poet, activist and chaplain
 LaKisha Jones – singer, American Idol contestant
 Michael Moore – documentary film director, author
 Don Riegle (1960) – United States Senator from Michigan
 Marietta S. Robinson – former commissioner of the U.S. Consumer Product Safety Commission
 John Sinclair (1964) – poet, political activist
 Tim Sneller – member of the Michigan House of Representatives from the 50th district
 Woodrow Stanley – former Michigan state representative, Mayor of Flint
 Phil Phelps - former Michigan state representative
 Rob Paulsen - voice-over artist

See also
 The Michigan Times

References

External links

 
Flint
Education in Flint, Michigan
Universities and colleges in Genesee County, Michigan
Public universities and colleges in Michigan
Educational institutions established in 1956
1956 establishments in Michigan
Buildings and structures in Flint, Michigan
Flint, Michigan
Tourist attractions in Flint, Michigan